Raphael Fernandes (born 1 December 1956) is a Kenyan field hockey player. He competed in the men's tournament at the 1984 Summer Olympics.

References

External links
 

1956 births
Living people
Kenyan male field hockey players
Olympic field hockey players of Kenya
Field hockey players at the 1984 Summer Olympics
Kenyan people of Indian descent
Kenyan people of Goan descent
Place of birth missing (living people)
20th-century Kenyan people